The Rosehill Guineas is an Australian Turf Club Group One Thoroughbred horse race for three-year-olds at set weights run over a distance of 2000 metres at Rosehill Gardens Racecourse in Sydney, Australia annually in March.  Total prize money for the race is A$600,000.

History

Many champions have been victorious in this race, including Phar Lap, Ajax, Tulloch, Dulcify, Kingston Town, Octagonal, Naturalism and Tie The Knot.

1921 racebook

Distance
 1910–1914 held -  7 furlongs (~1400 metres)
 1915–1947 held -   miles (~1800 metres)
 1948–1972 held -   miles (~2000 metres)
 1973 onwards - 2000 metres

Grade
 1910–1979 - Principal Race
 1980 onwards - Group 1

Race records
Time record:
 1:59.99 - Danewin (1995) & Octagonal (1996)

Gallery of noted winners

Winners

 2023 - Lindermann
 2022 - Anamoe
 2021 - Mo'unga
 2020 - Castelvecchio
 2019 - The Autumn Sun
 2018 - D'Argento
 2017 - Gingernuts
 2016 - Tarzino
 2015 - Volkstok'n'barrell
 2014 - Criterion
 2013 - It's A Dundeel
 2012 - Laser Hawk
 2011 - Jimmy Choux
 2010 - Zabrasive
 2009 - Metal Bender
 2008 - Dealer Principle
 2007 - He's No Pie Eater
 2006 - De Beers
 2005 - Eremein
 2004 - Niello
 2003 - Helenus
 2002 - Carnegie Express
 2001 - Sale Of Century
 2000 - Diatribe
 1999 - Sky Heights
 1998 - Tie The Knot
 1997 - Tarnpir Lane
 1996 -Octagonal
 1995 - Danewin
 1994 - Star Of Maple
 1993 - Innocent King
 1992 - Naturalism
 1991 - Surfers Paradise
 1990 - Solar Circle
 1989 - Riverina Charm
 1988 - Sky Chase
 1987 - Ring Joe
 1986 - Drawn
 1985 - Spirit Of Kingston
 1984 - Alibhai
 1983 - Strawberry Road
 1982 - Isle of Man
 1981 - Deck The Halls
 1980 - Kingston Town
 1979 - Dulcify
 1978 - †race not held
 1977 - Lefroy
 1976 - Fashion Beau
 1975 - Battle Sign 
 1974 - Taras Bulba
 1973 - Imagele
 1972 - Longfella
 1971 - Latin Knight
 1970 - Royal Show
 1969 - Portable
 1968 - Royal Account
 1967 - Grey Spirit
 1966 - Dark Briar
 1965 - Fair Summer
 1964 - Eskimo Prince
 1963 - Castanea
 1962 - Bogan Road
 1961 - King Brian
 1960 - Wenona Girl
 1959 - Martello Towers
 1958 - Bold Pilot
 1957 - Tulloch
 1956 - Gay Lover
 1955 - Caranna
 1954 - Pride Of Egypt
 1953 - Silver Hawk
 1952 - Idlewild
 1951 - Hydrogen
 1950 - Careless
 1949 - Thracian Lad
 1948 - Royal Andrew
 1947 - Conductor
 1946 - Prince Standard
 1945 - Questing
 1944 - Tea Rose
 1943 - Moorland
 1942 - Hall Stand
 1941 - Laureate
 1940 - Tidal Wave
 1939 - High Caste
 1938 - Aeolus
 1937 - Ajax
 1936 - Shakespeare
 1935 - Hadrian
 1934 - Silver King
 1933 - Blixten
 1932 - Bronze Hawk
 1931 - Lightning March
 1930 - Balloon King
 1929 - Phar Lap
 1928 - Mollison
 1927 - Winalot
 1926 - Cromwell
 1925 - Amounis
 1924 - Nigger Minstrel
 1923 - All Sunshine
 1922 - Caserta
 1921 - Furious
 1920 - Wirriway
 1919 - Elfacre
 1918 - Woorawa
 1917 - Biplane
 1916 - Wolaroi
 1915 - Wallace Isinglass
 1914 - Carlita
 1913 - Beau Soult
 1912 - Burri
 1911 - Woolerina
 1910 - Electric Wire

† Change in scheduling of race from spring to autumn

See also
 Australian Triple Crown of Thoroughbred Racing
 List of Australian Group races
 Group races

External links 
 First three placegetters Rosehill Guineas (ATC)

References

Group 1 stakes races in Australia
Flat horse races for three-year-olds
Recurring sporting events established in 1910
Sports competitions in Sydney